The S8 is a commuter rail route forming part of the Milan suburban railway service, which converges on the city of Milan, Italy.

The route runs over the infrastructure of the Lecco–Milan railway. Like all but one of the other Milan suburban railway service routes, it is operated by Trenord.

Route 
  Lecco ↔ Carnate-Usmate ↔ Milano Porta Garibaldi

Line S8, a radial route, heads initially in an southwesterly direction from Lecco to Monza.  From there, it turns south towards Milano Greco Pirelli, and finally south west again, to Milano Porta Garibaldi.

History 
The route was activated on 14 December 2008, and was initially an hourly regional rail service between its two termini.  In September 2009, the frequency of services on the route was increased, to bring it up to one service every 30 minutes during rush hour.

On 13 December 2009, the route was reclassified as the S8 suburban rail line. On 22 March 2010, service frequency was increased again, to bring services up to half-hourly intervals from 06:00 to 09:00 and from 12:00 to 22:00 on weekdays.

Stations 
The stations on the S8 are as follows (the stations with a coloured background are within the municipality of Milan):

Scheduling 
, S8 trains ran hourly between 06:00 and 24:00 Monday to Saturday, with additional services during rush hour in the mornings and evenings.

See also 

 History of rail transport in Italy
 List of Milan suburban railway stations
 Rail transport in Italy
 Transport in Milan

References

External links
 ATM – official site 
 Trenord – official site 
 Schematic of Line S8 – schematic depicting all stations on Line S8

This article is based upon a translation of the Italian language version as at November 2012.

Milan S Lines